Parapercis haackei, the wavy grubfish, is a fish species in the sandperch family, Pinguipedidae. It is found in the Eastern Indian Ocean around southern Western Australia and South Australia.

Etymology
The fish is named in honor of Johann Wilhelm Haacke (1855-1912), a German zoologist who emigrated to New Zealand and Australia, thus becoming director of the Adelaide Natural History Museum, which provided Steindachner with fishes from the St. Vincent Gulf in South Australia.

References

May, J.L. and J.G.H. Maxwell, 1986. Trawl fish from temperate waters of Australia. CSIRO Division of Fisheries Research, Tasmania. 492 p.

Pinguipedidae
Taxa named by Franz Steindachner
Fish described in 1884